Zinc finger protein 266 is a protein that in humans is encoded by the ZNF266 gene.

Function 

This gene encodes a protein containing many tandem zinc-finger motifs. Zinc fingers are protein or nucleic acid-binding domains, and may be involved in a variety of functions, including regulation of transcription. This gene is located in a cluster of similar genes encoding zinc finger proteins on chromosome 19. Alternative splicing results in multiple transcript variants for this gene.

References

Further reading